The sulphur-throated finch (Sicalis taczanowskii) is a species of bird in the family Thraupidae.
It is found in Ecuador and Peru.
Its natural habitat is subtropical or tropical dry shrubland.

References

sulphur-throated finch
Birds of Ecuador
Birds of Peru
Birds of the Tumbes-Chocó-Magdalena
sulphur-throated finch
Taxonomy articles created by Polbot